Dahmen is a German surname. Notable people with the surname include:

 Cathee Dahmen (1945–1997), model in the 1960s and 1970s
 Janosch Dahmen (born 1981), German politician
 Julia Dahmen (born 1977), German television actress
 Karin Dahmen (born 1969), German physicist
 Wolfgang Dahmen (born 1949), German mathematician
 Joel Dahmen (born 1987), American professional golfer

German-language surnames